The accident on the Rampe de Laffrey on July 22, 2007, was one of the most serious accidents to occur along a stretch of road widely considered among the most dangerous in France.  26 Polish pilgrims were killed when their bus flew off the road and into a ravine near the town of Vizille. 24 people were injured, 9 gravely.

History of the trip
The bus, loaded with pilgrims from Szczecin, Świnoujście, Warsaw and Stargard Szczeciński, had left Poland on July 10 for the start of a tour of Marian sanctuaries in southern Europe. It had made stops at Our Lady of Fatima in Portugal and at Our Lady of Lourdes, and finished at the sanctuary of Our Lady of La Salette. It crashed on its return trip to Poland; 47 pilgrims, a chaperone, and two drivers, all Polish, were on board.

Accident
 
At approximately 9:30 in the morning of July 22, the bus apparently lost the use of its brakes at the base of the hill, in a location known to be dangerous to drivers.  It missed the final curve of the descent and overturned into a ravine near the Romanche, where it immediately burst into flames.  The accident occurred at almost the same spot at which a Belgian bus suffered the same fate in 1973, killing 43.

Reaction
The accident provoked an outpouring of public support both in France and in Poland.  French Prime Minister François Fillon and Jean-Louis Borloo, then the Minister of Ecology and in charge of transport, immediately went to the scene of the accident.  Polish president Lech Kaczyński quickly came to Grenoble, where he was met by French president Nicolas Sarkozy; together, the two men visited the bedsides of several victims who had been transported to various local hospitals.

Inquiry
An inquiry immediately established that the bus should never have been driving along the Rampe in the first place, as use of the road is severely restricted, and forbidden to heavy vehicles without local authorization.  This authorization was rarely given, and only for specially equipped vehicles on local transport routes. Eyewitness testimony from survivors indicated that the driver, who, at 22, was the younger of the two assigned to the tour and had had his driver's license for only 10 months, had voluntarily ignored the itinerary.  He had chosen instead to follow a shorter route indicated on his GPS, in the process passing no fewer than 14 signs indicating that passage on the road was forbidden to heavy vehicles.  Both the other driver and the chaperone were severely injured but survived the crash.

The bus involved in the accident was a Scania that had entered into circulation in July 2000.  According to the Polish operator of the tour, it had passed a technical inspection in Germany three weeks prior to the accident without question.  It is not known if the bus was equipped with a speed-reduction system; similar recently built vehicles have been designed with a backup system, either electromagnetic or hydraulic, in addition to the usual brakes.

Motorists who were following the bus during its descent indicated that the brake lights appeared to be working normally.  Other drivers, however, indicated that they had seen sparks coming from the undercarriage, suggesting that the brakes may have indeed failed.  In addition, a survivor said in her testimony that the driver had warned passengers during the descent, crying out that the brakes had gone; she also said that just before this she had heard something crack under the bus.

Aftermath

At a press conference on July 25, Prime Minister Fillon announced that additional restrictions along the roadway would immediately be planned.  Flashing signs were to be installed, as were speed bumps as high as the former signs at the location.  At the end of September special gantries were also to have been placed, preventing the entry of vehicles over a certain height.  A barrier was also planned, containing a magnetic card designed to recognize only certain service vehicles that are authorized to use the road.  By January, 2008, no gantries had been placed at the site, and only a few of the signs were ready for use.  Furthermore, there was a good deal of evidence that unauthorized vehicles still used the road.

The gantries were inaugurated in July 2008.

On October 8, 2007, President Kaczynski presented a special decoration to 32 people who had participated in rescue efforts after the accident.  The ceremony took place at the Polish embassy in Paris.

See also
 List of Poland disasters by death toll
 Accident on the Rampe de Laffrey (1946)
 Accident on the Rampe de Laffrey (1973)
 Accident on the Rampe de Laffrey (1975)

Notes and references

2007 road incidents
Road incidents in France
Bus incidents in France
2007 in France
2007 in Poland
July 2007 events in France
2007 disasters in France

fr:Rampe de Laffrey#Accident du car polonais le 22 juillet 2007